Pia Ann Rosa-Della Cramling (born 23 April 1963) is a Swedish chess player. In 1992, she became the fifth woman to earn the FIDE title of Grandmaster (GM). Since the early 1980s, she has been one of the strongest female players in the world as well as having been the highest rated woman in the FIDE World Rankings on three occasions. She was the clear number one rated woman in the January 1984 rating list, and joint number one rated woman in the July 1984 list.

Career
Cramling is, aside from Judit Polgar (who chose not to play in women's events), the only woman to have earned the grandmaster title before 2000 who has never won the Women's World Champion crown. According to Cramling, one explanation for this is that the World Championship is a team effort and more prominent chess nations are able to give their players better support in important events. Nevertheless, Cramling has been in reasonably close contention for the crown on four occasions (all in different decades). In the 1986 and 1996 Candidates cycle she came in fourth and third respectively. Since the Women's World Championship has been held with the knock-out format, she reached the semifinals in 2008 and 2015. These latter results qualified her to play in the FIDE Women's Grand Prix series in 2009–11 and 2015–16 respectively. She has had greater success in Europe where she won the Women's European Individual Chess Championship in 2003 and 2010. In 2006, she won the Accentus Ladies Tournament in Biel.

In team competitions, Cramling represented Sweden in the Chess Olympiad in both the open and women's events, European Team Chess Championship in both open and women's sections, Telechess Olympiad and Nordic Cup. In the Women's Chess Olympiad, she has won the individual gold medal as the best player on board 1 (according to the rating performance) in 1984, 1988 and 2022. In the European Club Cup for Women, Cramling has won the team gold medal in 2007, 2008, 2010, 2012, 2013 and 2016 playing for team Cercle d'Echecs Monte Carlo.

Cramling earned the International Master (IM) title in 1983 and the Grandmaster (GM) title in 1992. She defeated Raymond Keene in the tournament where she earned her first IM norm. She earned her three GM norms in Italy in 1989, in Las Palmas in 1990, and Bern in 1992.

Personal life
Cramling is married to the Spanish grandmaster Juan Manuel Bellón López. She lived in Spain for a number of years, but later moved back to Sweden. They have a daughter, Anna Cramling Bellón, a Woman FIDE Master and a chess YouTuber. At the 42nd and 44th Chess Olympiad mother and daughter both played for Sweden, Pia being team captain on board 1 and Anna playing on board 5 and 3, respectively.

References

External links

 
 
 
 

1963 births
Living people
Sportspeople from Stockholm
Chess grandmasters
Female chess grandmasters
Chess woman grandmasters
Swedish female chess players
Chess Olympiad competitors
European Chess Champions
Swedish expatriates in Spain